Grundy Center Community School District, also known as Grundy Center Community Schools, is a rural public school district headquartered in Grundy Center, Iowa. It operates Grundy Center Elementary School and Grundy Center Secondary School.

The school district is entirely in Grundy County, and the district includes Grundy Center and Holland.

The school's mascot is the Spartan. Their colors are maroon and white.

As of the 2020–21 school year, the district operated three schools.  It had 746 students and 65.63 classroom teachers (on an FTE basis), for a student–teacher ratio of 11:37:1.

History

Cassi Murra served as superintendent until she moved to be superintendent of the Knoxville Community School District in 2014. Jerry Schutz began serving as superintendent that year.

Neil Mullen originally was to begin his role as superintendent on July 1, 2018. However, Mullen began on March 1 because Schutz later took another job that began before July 1.

By February 20, 2019, the Grundy Center district was looking for another superintendent. Rob Hughes was scheduled to begin his role as superintendent of both Grundy Center CSD and of Aplington–Parkersburg Community School District effective July 1, 2019.  In March of 2021, Hughes resigned from his position as a shared superintendent and became a full-time superintendent for Grundy Center.

Schools 
Schools in the district (with 2020–21 enrollment data from the National Center for Education Statistics) are:
Grundy Center Elementary School (263 students; in grades K-5)
Brian Sammons, Principal
Dan Breyfogle, Assistant Principal
Grundy Center Middle School (225; 5-8)
Grundy Center High School (215; 9-12)

Grundy Center High School

Athletics
The Spartans compete in the North Iowa Cedar League Conference in the following sports:

Cross country
Volleyball
Football
 3-time state champions (1984, 1987, 1988)
Basketball
 Girls' 2005 class 2A state champions
Wrestling
Track and field
Golf
 Boys' 2-time class 2A state champions (2003, 2005)
 Girls' 12-time Class 1A State Champions (1991, 1992, 1996, 1997, 1998, 1999, 2000, 2005, 2007, 2008, 2010, 2013)
Baseball
Softball
Soccer

Previously the football team had a rivalry with Gladbrook–Reinbeck High School that began circa 1908; circa 2017, the Gladbrook–Reinbeck team was moved to an eight-man division, forcing the rivalry to end.

See also
List of school districts in Iowa
List of high schools in Iowa

References

Further reading

External links
 Grundy Center Community School District
 

School districts in Iowa
Education in Grundy County, Iowa
Grundy Center, Iowa